Wemyss Bay railway station serves the village of Wemyss Bay, Inverclyde, Scotland. The station incorporates the Caledonian MacBrayne ferry terminal connecting mainland Scotland to Rothesay on the Isle of Bute. The station is managed by ScotRail.

In Britain's 100 Best Railway Stations by Simon Jenkins, the station was one of only ten to be awarded five stars, and was the station photographed on the front cover.

History 

Work began in late 1862 on the single track Greenock and Wemyss Bay Railway branching from the main Glasgow, Paisley and Greenock Railway at Port Glasgow and taking an inland route across to the coast at Inverkip before descending to Wemyss Bay. This was to connect to Clyde steamer services for Rothesay, Largs, and Millport, Isle of Cumbrae, allowing a combined train and steamer journey time of an hour and a half, compared with a typical time of three hours by steamer from Glasgow. The Wemyss Bay Steamboat Company was formed to own the connecting steamers, competing with the private owners of other Clyde steamer services. The route opened on 15 May 1865, but over-ambitious timetables led to severe delays during the first year, damaging the company's reputation, and the route subsequently faced strong competition from other pierheads. A camping coach was positioned here by the Scottish Region in 1961, then two coaches from 1962 to 1969, with an additional one in 1965 only.

Train services were electrified in 1967 by British Rail, using the 25 kV AC system.

Station building
The station was designed by James Miller in 1903 for the Caledonian Railway and is remarkable in its use of glass and steel curves. The station is noted for its architectural qualities and, although one of Scotland's finest railway buildings and Category A listed, it has suffered from neglect. A major refurbishment scheme carried out jointly by Network Rail, Inverclyde Council and the Scottish Government from June 2014 to the spring of 2016 has seen the station buildings and adjacent ferry terminal fully restored.

Two platforms are currently in use, though there were three available until 1987.

Services 
The average journey time is 55 minutes.

See also
 List of Category A listed buildings in Inverclyde 
 List of listed buildings in Inverkip, Inverclyde

References

Bibliography

External links 

 YouTube video of the station's interior

Category A listed buildings in Inverclyde
Listed railway stations in Scotland
Railway stations in Inverclyde
Former Caledonian Railway stations
Railway stations in Great Britain opened in 1865
SPT railway stations
Railway stations served by ScotRail
Railway stations serving harbours and ports in the United Kingdom
James Miller railway stations